The 2000 Grambling State Tigers football team represented Grambling State University as a member of the West Division Southwestern Athletic Conference (SWAC) during the 2000 NCAA Division I-AA football season. Led by third-year head coach Doug Williams, the Tigers compiled an overall record of 10–2 with a mark of 6–1 in conference play, winning the SWAC West Division title. Grambling State beat  in the SWAC Championship Game to the conference title. The team was also recognized as a black college football national champion. The Tigers offense scored 300 points while the defense allowed 207 points on the season. Grambling State played home games at Eddie G. Robinson Memorial Stadium in Grambling, Louisiana.

Schedule

Team players drafted into the NFL

References

Grambling State
Grambling State Tigers football seasons
Black college football national champions
Southwestern Athletic Conference football champion seasons
Grambling State Tigers football